Kimball is a town in McDowell County, West Virginia, United States. Per the 2020 census, the population was 145.

Kimball was incorporated in 1911 and named for Frederick J. Kimball, a railroad official. Kimball is the site of the first war memorial building erected in memory of the African-American veterans of World War I.

History
The Kimball mining disaster took place on July 18, 1919 at the Carswell coal mine in Kimball, killing six miners. Initial reports said that 221 men had been killed, but they were trapped by the explosion. A rescue party was able to dig through the wreckage, allowing 215 to return alive to the surface.

Geography

The town is on the Norfolk Southern Railway (former Norfolk and Western) network.

Economics
From 2005 when it opened until its closure in 2016, a Walmart superstore was the largest employer in the town.

Kimball is home to the Five Loaves and Two Fishes foodbank, which features a hydropanel water production system which can produce 950 gallons of clean drinking water monthly.

Media
The town is served by the thrice-weekly The Welch News out of the nearby county seat, Welch.

Demographics

2020 census

Note: the US Census treats Hispanic/Latino as an ethnic category. This table excludes Latinos from the racial categories and assigns them to a separate category. Hispanics/Latinos can be of any race.

2010 census
As of the census of 2010, there were 194 people, 78 households, and 52 families living in the town. The racial makeup of the town was 37.6% White, 57.2% African American, and 5.2% from two or more races.

There were 78 households, of which 33.3% had children under the age of 18 living with them, 32.1% were married couples living together, 26.9% had a female householder with no husband present, 7.7% had a male householder with no wife present, and 33.3% were non-families. 29.5% of all households were made up of individuals, and 12.8% had someone living alone who was 65 years of age or older. The average household size was 2.49 and the average family size was 3.08.

The median age in the town was 43 years. 23.7% of residents were under the age of 18; 10.3% were between the ages of 18 and 24; 18.6% were from 25 to 44; 28.9% were from 45 to 64; and 18.6% were 65 years of age or older. The gender makeup of the town was 45.4% male and 54.6% female.

2000 census
At the 2000 census, there were 411 people, 166 households and 107 families living in the town. The racial makeup of the town was 34.06% White, 63.26% African American, 0.24% Pacific Islander, and 2.43% from two or more races.

There were 166 households, of which 22.3% had children under the age of 18 living with them, 33.1% were married couples living together, 27.1% had a female householder with no husband present, and 35.5% were non-families. 33.7% of all households were made up of individuals, and 20.5% had someone living alone who was 65 years of age or older. The average household size was 2.48 and the average family size was 3.12.

24.1% of the population were under the age of 18, 10.7% from 18 to 24, 18.2% from 25 to 44, 23.4% from 45 to 64, and 23.6% who were 65 years of age or older. The median age was 42 years. For every 100 females, there were 72.7 males. For every 100 females age 18 and over, there were 62.5 males.

The median household income was $17,333, and the median family income was $21,429. Males had a median income of $23,750 versus $21,250 for females. The per capita income for the town was $10,269. About 23.6% of families and 33.2% of the population were below the poverty line, including 48.1% of those under age 18 and 14.4% of those age 65 or over.

Notable people
 Tracy Gravely - former Canadian Football League linebacker
 Jean Battlo - West Virginia playwright, born and raised in Kimball

References

External links
 Kimball Elementary School

Towns in McDowell County, West Virginia
Towns in West Virginia
Coal towns in West Virginia